"What It Is" is the first single from Korn singer Jonathan Davis, to be featured on his debut album Black Labyrinth.

The song is his first solo track since 2012's "Silent Hill", from the Silent Hill: Downpour soundtrack. After a teaser was released on 25 January 2018, it was released the next day along with a music video, and confirmation of Davis' signing to Sumerian Records. It is also featured on the soundtrack for the Sumerian Films movie American Satan. On 1 October 2020 Jonathan released a country version of the song.

Track listing

Charts

Personnel
Jonathan Davis - vocals
Wes Borland - guitars
Zac Baird - keyboards
Ray Luzier - drums
Shenkar - violin, additional vocals

References

2018 songs
Jonathan Davis songs
Songs written by Lauren Christy
Songs written by Gary Clark (musician)
Songs written by Jonathan Davis
Gothic metal songs